Sun Center Studios is a television and film sound stage located in Chester Township, Delaware County, Pennsylvania (Aston ZIP code).  Opened in 2011, it is Pennsylvania's first purpose-built studio.  

Films shot at the studio include:
 After Earth - directed by M. Night Shyamalan and starring Will Smith
 Paranoia - starring Harrison Ford and Liam Hemsworth
 Creed - Sylvester Stallone (filmed at Sun Center Studios in February and March 2015)
 The Benefactor - starring Richard Gere and Dakota Fanning
 The Upside - directed by Neil Burger and starring Bryan Cranston, Kevin Hart and Nicole Kidman

References

External links
 

American film studios
Buildings and structures in Delaware County, Pennsylvania
Television studios in the United States
2011 establishments in Pennsylvania